The 2014 Canadian Tire National Skating Championships was held from January 9 to 15, 2014 at the Canadian Tire Centre, then-named Scotiabank Place. The event determines the national champions of Canada and was organized by Skate Canada, the nation's figure skating governing body as well as sponsored by Canadian Tire. Medals were awarded in the disciplines of men's singles, women's singles, pair skating, and ice dancing on the senior, junior, and novice levels. Although the official International Skating Union terminology for female skaters in the singles category is ladies, Skate Canada uses women officially. The results of this competition are among the selection criteria for the 2014 Winter Olympics, 2014 World Championships, the 2014 Four Continents Championships, and the 2014 World Junior Championships.

In December 2012, it was announced that Ottawa, Ontario would host the 100th anniversary event.

Senior results

Men

Women

Pairs

Ice dancing

Junior results

Men

Women

Pairs

Ice dancing

Novice results

Men

Women

Pairs

Ice dancing

International team selections

Winter Olympics
The Olympic team was announced on January 12, 2014:

Four Continents Championships
Skate Canada announced the Canadian team to the 2014 Four Continents Championships on January 20, 2014:

World Junior Championships
Skate Canada announced the Canadian team to the 2014 World Junior Championships on Mar 7, 2014:

World Championships
Skate Canada announced the Canadian team to the 2014 World Championships on Mar 20, 2014:

References

External links
 2014 Canadian Figure Skating Championships results at Skate Canada
 Skate Canada

Canadian Figure Skating Championships
Figure skating
Canadian Figure Skating Championships
Sports competitions in Ottawa
Canadian Figure Skating Championships
Canadian Figure Skating Championships
2010s in Ottawa